Walt Tomenga (born October 29, 1946) is a former Iowa State Representative from the 69th District. He served in the Iowa House of Representatives from 2005 to 2009.

During his last term, Tomenga served on several committees in the Iowa House - the Human Resources, Judiciary, and Public Safety committees.  He also served on the Health and Human Services Appropriations Subcommittee and on the Public Retirement Systems Committee.

Electoral history
*incumbent

References

External links

 Calhoun on Project Vote Smart
 Calhoun's Capitol Web Address

1946 births
Living people
Politicians from Philadelphia
Republican Party members of the Iowa House of Representatives